Celtic TV is the official Internet channel of Celtic F.C. It was a television channel until 2009 but was relaunched online, replacing Channel 67.

History
Launched in 2004, Celtic TV was operated by the Irish company Setanta Sports and was available on satellite and cable platforms in the UK and Ireland until the demise of the Pay TV operator's UK operation on 23 June 2009, resulting in all of the Setanta run channels including, Celtic TV and its Old Firm counterpart, Rangers TV, being closed. (The latter has since reopened.) After Setanta Sports entered administration and ceased all broadcasting on its core channels and the channels were closed, Celtic announced that Celtic TV has ceased broadcasting and the channel would not return until a deal with a new rights holder was struck. In 2011, it returned as an Internet-only channel, replacing Channel 67 under the Celtic TV name. The channel is 100% owned by the club.

See also 
 The Celtic View, official club magazine

Notes and references

External links
Official site

Celtic F.C.
Defunct television channels in Scotland
Football mass media in Scotland
Football club television channels in the United Kingdom
Television channels and stations established in 2004
Television channels and stations disestablished in 2009
Television channels in the United Kingdom
2004 establishments in Scotland
2009 disestablishments in Scotland
Scottish Premiership on television
Internet television channels